Events from the year 1571 in Sweden

Incumbents
 Monarch – John III

Events

 16 march - The Russian Siege of Reval in Swedish Estonia ends.
 march - Swedish victory over the Russians in the Battle of Ubagall.
 August - The deposed monarch and his family is taken to Åland. 
 October - The deposed monarch and his family is taken to Gripsholm Castle.
 - A tax is introduced in order to pay the Danish ransom of Älvsborg.
 - The church order of Laurentius Petri is finally accepted. 
 - The education system is officially transferred to the Lutheran Church from the former Catholic church.
 - The creation of the Swedish Church Ordinance 1571, the first complete order of the Protestant Swedish church. The church ordinance also includes a chapter about schooling, in which all children in the cities, regardless of sex, are to be given elementary schooling.
 - The ban from 1560 is retracted and the church are permitted to baptize, marry and bury the Romani.
 - The church ordinance declare that a son or son-in-law of a priest should be chosen first to succeed him as parish vicar.

Births

Deaths

References

 
Years of the 16th century in Sweden
Sweden